The 1950 California Golden Bears football team was an American football team that represented the University of California, Berkeley in the Pacific Coast Conference (PCC) during the 1950 college football season. In their fourth year under head coach Pappy Waldorf, the team compiled a 9–1–1 record (5–0–1 against PCC opponents), won the PCC championship, lost to Michigan in the 1951 Rose Bowl, was ranked No. 5 in the final AP Poll, and outscored its opponents by a combined total of 224 to 90.

The star of this season was guard and linebacker Les Richter, who years later became the first Golden Bear to be inducted into the Pro Football Hall of Fame.

Schedule

References

California
California Golden Bears football seasons
Pac-12 Conference football champion seasons
California Golden Bears football